Grip Inc. was an American groove metal band and side project of drummer Dave Lombardo. The band was formed in 1993 and was signed to Steamhammer Records.

History 
Following the birth of his first child in 1993, Lombardo formed Grip Inc. with Voodoocult guitarist Waldemar Sorychta. The pair recruited bassist Jason VieBrooks and vocalist Gus Chambers to complete the line-up, releasing their debut record Power of Inner Strength (1995), distributed via Metal Blade Records.

Prior to the album's release Lombardo described leaving Slayer as a career low, because he did not know what type of music to play. AllMusic reviewer Vincent Jeffries singled out Lombardo for praise on the album, remarking that Slayer fans "will enjoy the drummer's double bass work and overall aggression throughout the disc." Sorychta said critics and music fans always spot mistakes in their music, because of Lombardo's popularity with Slayer – expecting the band to sound like Slayer and complain. However, when Lombardo uses the double bass drum, Sorychta said people complain "now Grip Inc. sound exactly like Slayer."

The band released Nemesis in 1997. Jeffries praised Lombardo's "crushing drum work" which takes center stage on the album. Bassist VieBrooks left the band and was replaced by Stuart Carruthers in 1997. With a new bassist, the band released Solidify in 1999, which was described as a step towards "progressive and exotic rhythms, structures, and instrumentations, while never compromising intensity" by Jeffries.

Members

Final line-up 
Gus Chambers – vocals (1993–2006; died 2008)
Dave Lombardo – drums, percussion (1993–2006)
Waldemar Sorychta – guitars (1993–2006), bass (1999–2006)

Former members 
Chaz Grimaldi – bass (1993)
Bobby Gustafson – guitar (1993)
Jason VieBrooks – bass (1993–1997)
Stuart Carruthers – bass (1997–1999)

Discography

Studio albums

Music videos

References

External links 
Grip Inc at Myspace

SPV (Label) page for Grip Inc.
coventrytelegraph.net

Musical groups established in 1993
American groove metal musical groups
American progressive metal musical groups
Heavy metal musical groups from California
1993 establishments in California
Musical groups from Los Angeles